Goodenia kakadu is a species of flowering plant in the family Goodeniaceae and is endemic to the Northern Territory. It is a prostrate herb with narrow oblong leaves in rosettes on stolons, and small dark red flowers arranged singly in leaf axils.

Description

Taxonomy and naming
Goodenia kakadu was first formally described in 1990 by Roger Charles Carolin in the journal Telopea from material collected in 1980 in Kakadu National Park by Lyndley Craven. The specific epithet (kakadu) is a reference to the type location.

Distribution and habitat
This goodenia grows in shady, seasonally inundated areas in the northern parts of the Northern Territory.

Conservation status
Goodenia kakaduis classified as "data deficient" under the Northern Territory Government Territory Parks and Wildlife Conservation Act 1976.

References

kakadu
Flora of the Northern Territory
Plants described in 1990
Taxa named by Roger Charles Carolin